Bestamak (also known as Bestamaq (Bestamak, Bestamaq, بەستاماق)) is a town in Aktobe Region, west Kazakhstan.

References

Aktobe Region
Cities and towns in Kazakhstan